Archinemapogon assamensis is a moth of the family Tineidae. It found in India and Russia.

References

Moths described in 1980
Nemapogoninae